Gerhard Egger (born 14 October 1949 in Gosau, Upper Austria), is an Austrian songwriter, composer, author and Alpenrockpioneer. He is also known as the  "Mostrocker".

CV

Folk musician (since 1953)

From 1956 Gerhard Egger attended the primary school in Gosau and from 1960 the secondary school in Bad Goisern. In the school band he performed for the first time with the later rock singer Wilfried Scheutz Scheutz.

1964 he left his village to attend the grammar school in Oberschützen in southern Burgenland, Austria, which had its focus on music. For the first time the autodidact had piano and organ lessons. He was fascinated by the song writing qualities of the Beatles and soon started to teach himself to play the guitar. He also began to write songs in English.

Songwriter (since 1964) 
1969 he moved to Linz, attended the teacher training college and won the Interpretenwettbewerb des Innviertel Grand Prix with his own songs. 1971, as singer, guitarist and songwriter of the group Art Boys Collection  he reached number 3 in the Discparade of the radio station Ö3. (Due to a change in the counting system, the months May till December 1971 are missing in the statistics of the Austrian Charts). After that he toured with the Milestones, Worried Men Skiffle Group, Waterloo & Robinson or Marika Lichter.

For the 1972 released ABC-Album Stoned Wall Egger mixed different unusual styles in his songs. After a radio boycott this production was only moderately successful. Egger left the group, finished his studies, began teaching as a primary school teacher in Stadl-Paura and backpacked through Europe as a musician for two summers.

Pedagogue (since 1971)
He got married in 1974 and became the spokesperson of the "Aktionsgruppe Volksschullehrer" that paved the way for the legal equality of primary and secondary school teachers.

1975 he changed his Anglo-American style mix into Austrian dialect and added elements of folk music. Without much expectation for success for this kind of Alpine music, he toured through Austria and Bavaria with the Coverband "Broadway" as a part-time keyboarder and singer.

Producer (since 1980)
Together with other musicians he founded the Tonstudio Ringstraße in Wels in 1980. Later the composer Hanneliese Kreissl-Wurth joined them. Apart from producing he also wrote songs for Waterloo & Robinson, Waterloo solo and Wilfried Scheutz some of which were produced by Christian Kolonovits or Klaus Prünster.

Mostrocker (since 1985) 

Together with the guitarist Gery Moder, he launched the band Gerhard Egger & Die Mostrocker in 1985. They called the then hardly known mix of styles between rock and folk music "Mostrock". Line-up: G. Egger (vocals, guitar, keyboards), G. Moder (guitar), W. Zeininger (bass), W. Grabmayr (keyboards), M. Eder (drums).

1987 the first album Vom Dachstoa bis nach Tennessee gained some attention, quite some time before musicians like Attwenger, Rauhnacht, Ausseer Hardbradler, Seer and Hubert von Goisern became famous for a similar music style.

His second album was the Alpine-Rock-Opera "Hallstatt-Das Mystical" which was released 1991. The rock theatre had its debut performance on occasion of the Hallstatt culture week "Kunst im Hochtal" in 1993

As a successful composer he became a member of the cooperative with voting power of the österreichische Urheberrechtsgesellschaft in 1994 AKM. The same year he moved to Lambach.

1995 Egger/Moder in cooperation with the studio musicians Willi Langer and Tommy Böröcz produced the third album Hoamatblues. The single "Scheni Leni" has been a success in the radio stations until the present day. After that he did an Alpinrock-double-tour with the Ausseer Hardbradler. Line-up: G. Egger (vocals, guitar, Knopfharmonika, mouth organ), G. Moder (guitar), G. Landschützer (keyboards), Chr. Sigl (bass), F. Stingl (drums).

1996 Egger composed the alpine-rock children’s musical Der Flößerkater & Die Traungeister and performed it with 300 people in Stadl-Paura. Additionally he wrote an accompanying reading and songbook.

1997 on occasion of the 10th anniversary of the protest movement for the preservation of the Hainburger Au he gave a concert at the Vienna Rathaus. The single "Gemmas an" from the fourth album Grenzgänger remained in the Austrian Top-15-Airplaycharts for 25 weeks. During the tour Grenzgänger he played in the Ernst-Happel-stadium in Vienna as well as in the Funkausstellung Berlin.

World-musician (since 1998) 

1998, under the motto "Think globally, act locally" Egger composed and produced the "Stadlinger Hymne" (hymn of Stadl-Paura). The result was an album which comprised ten different versions and interpreters from different musical genres (pop, rock, folk, choral and classical music).

1999, on the occasion of the Weltfest (world festival) of the MIVA he composed the "WeltSong" and performed it together with musicians from Africa, Latin America, Asia and Europe.

2000, he dedicated Olympic surfing champion Christoph Sieber the Christoph-Sieber-Surfing-Song and performed it at his Olympic-Gala.

In cooperation with the author Ruth Zizlavsky he wrote a reading and song book for children with the title Rüdiger, der Feuerdrache.

2002 he was approached by the newspaper Oberösterreichische Nachrichten to set the dialect text of the Franz Stelzhamer-lyrical contest "Segn und Sagn" to music. The result was a CD which was presented at a gala evening at the Landestheater Linz.

2003 Egger released the album "SchonZeit" with his musical versions of the Stelzhamer poems. After that he went on tour through Austria with his Mostrockern and his new drummer Stefan Hofer.

Headmaster (since 2003)

2003 Gerhard Egger became headmaster of the primary school in Stadl-Paura. For the following six years he dedicated his time and energy to school development. It is worth noting that at school he was the only man among 25 women.

2009 he retired from his pedagogical work and was awarded the "Ehrenring der Gemeinde Stadl-Paura". The same year his "Zwiegedichte" were published in the Lyrik-Anthologie of the Stelzhamerbund.

Author (since 2009)
2010 the "Mostrocker" published the book "Zeitspuren aus dem inneren Salzkammergut". In posthumous cooperation with his grandfather he went on a historical trail through his personal as well as general history. The book was presented at the Frankfurt book fair.

2011 the 40-year-old album of his first band Art Boys Collection was newly released. Thanks to radio and internet platforms all around the world it reached number one in the Nitro-Download-Charts. Reviews from Japan to the USA thought it was one of the most beautiful rediscoveries of the last years. Collectors paid up to 1.500 € for an original 1972 LP

Late Works (since 2012) 

2012 Egger released his album "Gerhard Eggers Lonely Mostrock Band“ with 12 self-written songs in the Beatles-Style. 6 of them has been played more than 5000 times on Austrian Radio Stations.

2019 he came back to the public with his album "Regenbogenland“, the first part of a rocktheater-soundtrack, by returning to the spirit of woodstock and the peace movement of 1969.

Discography

Albums 
1972: Stoned Wall – Art Boys Collection with Gerhard Egger, Album, Lesborne
1987: Vom Dachstoa bis nach Tennessee – Gerhard Egger & Die Mostrocker, Album, Riff Records
1991: Hallstatt–Das Mystical – Gerhard Egger & Die Mostrocker, Album, Riff Records
1995: Hoamatblues Gerhard Egger & Die Mostrocker, Album, Koch Int.
1996: Der Flößerkater & DieTraungeister – Gerhard Egger, Album, Riff Records
1997: Grenzgänger – Egger, Album, Koch Int.
2000: Stadlinger Hymne – Gerhard Egger & friends, Album, Riff Records
2001: Stoned Wall – Art Boys Collection with Gerhard Egger, Album, Garden of Delights
2004: SchonZeit – Gerhard Egger & Die Mostrocker, Album, Musica
2011: Stoned Wall – Art Boys Collection with Gerhard Egger, Release-Vinyl-Album, Golden Pavilion
2012: Gerhard Eggers Lonely Mostrock Band – Gerhard Egger & Die Mostrocker, Album, Birne Records
2019: Regenbogenland – Gerhard Egger & Die Mostrocker, Album, Birne Records

Singles 
1970: Lemon Tree – Art Boys Collection with Gerhard Egger, Single, Lesborne
1971: Jesus Said – Art Boys Collection with Gerhard Egger, Single, Lesborne
1971: Life Is A Dream – Art Boys Collection with Gerhard Egger, Single, Interpop
1971: Freedom Voice of My Soul – Art Boys Collection with Gerhard Egger, Single, Lesborne
1987: Der Summa is im kumma – Gerhard Egger & Die Mostrocker, Single, Ringstrasse
1995: Scheni Leni – Gerhard Egger & Die Mostrocker, Single-Koch Int.
1995: Übern See – Gerhard Egger & Die Mostrocker, Single, Koch Int.
1996: Touristen – Gerhard Egger & Die Mostrocker, Single, Koch Int.
1997: Gemma's an – Egger, Single, Koch Int.
1999: WeltSong – Gerhard Egger & Die WeltBand, Single, Riff Records
2003: Schonzeit – Gerhard Egger & Die Mostrocker, Single, Musica
2012: Mondsuechtig – Gerhard Egger & Mostrocker, Single, Birne Records
2013: Tanz mit mir Marie – Gerhard Egger & Die Mostrocker, Single, Birne Records
2018: Himmi voller Stern – Gerhard Egger & Die Mostrocker, Single, Birne Records
2018: Dezemberschnee – Gerhard Egger & Die Mostrocker, Single, Birne Records

Compilations 
1970: Pop Made in Austria 1 – Lesborne
1971: Pop Made in Austria 3 – Lesborne
1974: Zwickt's mi – Lesborne
1995: Alpen-Rock 3 – Koch Int.
1996: Gipfelstürmer 2 – MCA
1996: Alpen-Rock 96 – Koch Int.
1997: Ottis Schlachtplatte – Koch Int.
1997: Best of Alpenrock–Hits der 80er u. 90er – BGM Ariola
1998: Almenrock – Koch Int.
1998: Alpen-Rock – Koch Int.
1999: Alpen-Rock im Doppelpack II – Koch Int.
1999: Alpenrock presented by M&M – BGM Ariola
1999: Bayern Power – Zyx Music
1999: Der Berg ruft – Junge Klänge – Verlag Das Beste
2000: Alpen-Rock im Doppelpack III – Koch Int.
2001: Power der Berge – Koch Universal
2001: Psychedelic Underground – Garden of Delights
2002: Segn und Sagn – Riff Records
2004: Alpenrock Hüttenkracher – Koch Universal

Books 
1996: Der Flößerkater und die Traungeister – Lese- und Liederbuch – Gerhard Egger – Riff-Productions Lambach
2001: Rüdiger, der Feuerdrache – Kinderbuch – Gerhard Egger/Ruth Zizlavsky – Verlag HKM Lambach
2009: Mundart 2009 – Lyrikanthologie des Stelzhamerbundes – Gerhard Egger/Diverse – Verlag Plöchl Freistadt
2010: Zeitspuren aus dem inneren Salzkammergut – Gerhard Egger/Josef Posch – Edition Innsalz

Awards 

1970: Winning singer of the "Innviertel-Grand-Prix"
1993: Förderpreis der AUME für die Alpinrock-Oper "Hallstatt-Das Mystical"
2000: Kulturplakette der Gemeinde Stadl-Paura
2009: Verleihung des Ehrenringes der Gemeinde Stadl-Paura

References

Literature 

Gerhard Egger/Josef Posch: Zeitspuren aus dem inneren Salzkammergut. Edition Innsalz, Ranshofen/Osternberg 2010, . Deutsche Nationalbibliothek.

Anthologie: Mundart 2009. Verlag Plöchl, Freistadt 2009, .

External links 
 http://www.mostrocker.com
 http://db.musicaustria.at/node/53076
 http://www.discogs.com/artist/Gerhard+Egger
 http://www.sra.at/band/9265

Austrian male musicians
1949 births
Living people
People from Gmunden District
Austrian songwriters
Male songwriters
Austrian male composers